Rabbids Big Bang is a video game which was developed by Ubisoft Milan in collaboration with Ubisoft Paris and published by Ubisoft on October 17, 2013 in Europe, North America and Japan for iOS and Android. This is a spin-off game of the Raving Rabbids games franchise.

Gameplay
The game features 150 levels. In this game, players control the Rabbids along with their jetpacks to fling them across space, avoiding obstacles such as cows and the gravitational forces of other planets. Players are able to customize both their Rabbid and its jetpack.

Reception

Rabbids Big Bang received mixed or average reviews. Touch Arcade called it predictable and lacking in humor. Pocket Gamer complained about the sense of physics and a lack of personality, calling the game frustrating and forgettable. GameZebo found the game humorous but felt the gameplay was shallow and ultimately best suited for short play sessions.

References

2013 video games
Party video games
Rabbids
IOS games
Ubisoft games
Android (operating system) games
Video games about rabbits and hares
Video games developed in Italy